The National Popular Movement was a political party in Morocco.

History and profile
The party was founded in 1991, as a split of the Popular Movement, under veteran Berber politician and former defense minister Mahjoubi Aherdane, and is known to have a very strong Berber element.

At the legislative elections on 27 September 2002, the party won 18 out of 325 seats.

The party was dissolved and merged back into the Popular Movement in 2006.

References

1991 establishments in Morocco
Political parties established in 1991
Political parties in Morocco

Political parties disestablished in 2006